Kevin Sucher is an American record producer, recording engineer, mixer, and artist who is best known for his work with Eric Benet and Diane Warren. In March 2020, Sucher was named the Executive Director of 88Nine Radio Milwaukee.

Career 
Sucher started his record producing career in 1993. In the early 1990s he opened his own recording studio, the Laboratory Recording Studio. In 2007, Sucher began working with Eric Benet. Sucher produced, engineered, and mixed several of the songs that were built into tracks on the album Love & Life. The album was nominated for Best R&B Album and Best Male Vocal R&B Performance at the 51st Annual Grammy Awards. Sucher also worked as engineer and mixer on Benet's "Sometimes I Cry", which was nominated for Best Traditional R&B Performance at the 54th Annual Grammy Awards in 2010. In 2022, Sucher returned to the stage and opened a Las Vegas headlining residency with his band the Docksiders.

Selected discography
 2006: The Gufs – A Different Sea (producing, engineering, mixing)
 2008: Eric Benet – Love & Life (engineering, mixing)
 2009: Najee – Mind over Matter (engineering, mixing)
 2010: Eric Benet – Lost in Time (production consultant, administration, sound consultant, engineer, instrumentation, keyboards, mixing)
 2010: Bishop Darrell Hines – Darrell Hines Live (engineer)
 2012: Eric Benet – The One (engineering, mixing, management)

Credits
Sucher has produced or engineered works for the following artists:

Eric Benet
The Tenors
Stevie Wonder
Gwen Stefani
Najee
Train
Michelle Branch
Sheryl Crow
Bishop Darrell Hines
The Docksiders
David Foster
El DeBarge
Fifth Harmony
Little Mix
DeAndre Brackensick
Ruslan Sirota
LeAnn Rimes
Gloria Estefan
Diane Warren
Due Voci
Toni Braxton
Olivia Newton-John
Tony Orlando
The Gufs

References

Living people
American male songwriters
American record producers
Year of birth missing (living people)